Hayley Catherine Rose Vivien Mills (born 18 April 1946) is an English actress. The daughter of Sir John Mills and Mary Hayley Bell and younger sister of actress Juliet Mills, she began her acting career as a child and was hailed as a promising newcomer, winning the BAFTA Award for Most Promising Newcomer for her performance in the British crime drama film Tiger Bay (1959), the Academy Juvenile Award for Disney's Pollyanna (1960) and Golden Globe Award for New Star of the Year – Actress in 1961.

During her early career, she appeared in six films for Walt Disney, including her dual role as twins Susan and Sharon in the Disney film The Parent Trap (1961). Her performance in Whistle Down the Wind (a 1961 adaptation of the novel written by her mother) saw Mills nominated for the BAFTA Award for Best British Actress and she was voted the biggest star in Britain for 1961. According to one writer "She was a movie star for about a decade... a genuine, old-school, above-the-title movie star: listed in box-office polls, the focus of a carefully-protected public image, signatory to a long-term contract with a studio who would try to craft vehicles for her. In fact, you could make an argument that Hayley Mills was one of the last stars for whom that last factor applied, at least in English-speaking cinema."

In the late 1960s, Mills began performing in theatrical plays, making her stage debut in a 1969 West End revival of Peter Pan. She also played in more mature roles. For her success with Disney, she received the Disney Legend Award. Although she has not maintained the box office success or the Hollywood A-list she experienced as a child actress, she has continued to make films and TV appearances, including a starring role in the UK television mini-series The Flame Trees of Thika in 1981, the title role in Disney's television series Good Morning, Miss Bliss in 1988, and as Caroline, a main character in Wild at Heart  (2007–2012) on ITV in the UK. She published her memoirs, Forever Young, in 2021.

Early life and career
Mills was born on 18 April 1946, in Marylebone, London. She was 12 when she was discovered by J. Lee Thompson, who was initially looking for a boy to play the lead role in Tiger Bay, which co-starred her father, veteran British actor Sir John Mills. The movie was popular at the box office in Britain.

Disney
Bill Anderson, one of Walt Disney's producers, saw Tiger Bay and suggested that Mills be given the lead role in Pollyanna (1960). The role of the orphaned "glad girl" who moves in with her aunt catapulted her to stardom in the United States and earned her a special Academy Award of Juvenile Oscar, the last person to win the accolade. Because she could not be present to receive the trophy, Annette Funicello accepted it on her behalf. Disney subsequently cast Mills as twins Sharon and Susan who reunite their divorced parents in The Parent Trap (1961). In the film, she sings "Let's Get Together" as a duet with herself. The song was a hit around the world, reaching number 8 in the US.

Mills received an offer to make a film in Britain for Bryan Forbes, Whistle Down the Wind (1961), based on a novel by her mother Mary Hayley Bell, about some children who believe an escaped convict is Jesus. It was a hit at the British box office and she was voted the biggest star in Britain for 1961. Mills was offered the title role in Lolita by Stanley Kubrick, but her father turned it down. "I wish I had done it", she said in 1962. "It was a smashing film." Mills returned to Disney for an adventure film, In Search of the Castaways (1962), based on a novel by Jules Verne. It was another popular success, and she was voted the fifth biggest star in the country for the next two years.

In 1963, Disney announced plans to film an adaptation of  Dodie Smith's novel I Capture the Castle, with Mills in the role of Cassandra. Disney ended up dropping the project, while still retaining film rights to the book, when the novelist and the selected screenwriter Sally Benson did not get along; Mills grew too old for the part before the project could be revived. Her fourth movie for Disney did less well than her previous Disney films, but was still successful: Summer Magic (1963), a musical adaptation of the novel Mother Carey's Chickens. Ross Hunter hired her for a British-American production The Chalk Garden (1964), playing a girl who torments governess Deborah Kerr. Back at Disney she was in a film about jewel thieves, The Moon-Spinners (1964), getting her first on screen kiss from Peter McEnery. Mills had a change of pace with Sky West and Crooked (1965), set in the world of gypsies, written by her mother and directed by her father, but it was not commercially successful. In contrast, her last film with Disney, the comedy That Darn Cat! (also 1965), did very well at the box office.

During her six-year run at Disney, Mills was arguably the most popular child actress of the era. Critics noted that America's favourite child star was, in fact, quite British and very ladylike. The success of "Let's Get Together" (which hit No. 8 on the Billboard Hot 100 singles chart, No. 17 in Britain and No. 1 in Mexico,) also led to the release of a record album on Disney's Buena Vista label, Let's Get Together with Hayley Mills, which also included her only other hit song, "Johnny Jingo" (Billboard No. 21, 1962). In 1962, British exhibitors voted her the most popular film actress in the country.

In Forever Young: A Memoir, among other topics, she reveals high points from her early career, as well as struggles with self-esteem and an eating disorder. Describing how she turned down roles that "undermined the Disney image" such as Doctor Doolittle and Stanley Kubrick's Lolita, she wrote that "I think by being under contract to Walt Disney, as much as I really appreciated the opportunity it gave me, [and] the career it gave me, quite frankly, it hampered me from getting more different kinds of roles and eventually it also influenced how I felt about myself. I wasn’t sure what I was capable of." Ultimately, at age 20, she had turned down a new Disney contract, as she felt her character castings led to her "repeating herself" with the studio. She also detailed, how at age 21, she lost most of her Disney fortune to a 90% tax rate implemented by the Inland Revenue in England. Her appeal to regain her funds was eventually shot down, with Mills admitting that at that time, she was worried about going the path of Judy Garland and becoming a "studio asset."

Post-Disney film career
For Universal, Mills made another film with her father, The Truth About Spring (1965), co-starring Disney regular James MacArthur as her love interest. It was mildly popular. However The Trouble with Angels (1966), was a huge hit; she played as a prankish Catholic boarding school girl with "scathingly brilliant" schemes, opposite screen veteran Rosalind Russell, and directed by another Hollywood veteran, Ida Lupino.  She then provided the voice of the Little Mermaid for The Daydreamer (1966).

Roy Boulting
Shortly after The Truth About Spring, Mills appeared alongside her father and Hywel Bennett in director Roy Boulting's critically acclaimed film The Family Way (1966), a comedy about a couple having difficulty consummating their marriage, featuring a score by Paul McCartney and arrangements by Beatles producer George Martin. She began a romantic relationship with Boulting and they eventually married, in 1971. She then starred as the protagonist of Pretty Polly (1967), opposite famous Indian film actor Shashi Kapoor, in Singapore.

Mills made another movie for Boulting, the controversial horror thriller Twisted Nerve in 1968, along with her Family Way co-star Hywel Bennett. She made a comedy, Take a Girl Like You (1970), with Oliver Reed and made her West End debut in The Wild Duck in 1970. She worked for Boulting again on Mr. Forbush and the Penguins (1971), replacing the original female lead.

In 1972 Mills again acted opposite Hywel Bennett in Endless Night along with Britt Ekland, Per Oscarsson and George Sanders. It is based on the novel Endless Night by Agatha Christie. She made two films for Sidney Hayers, What Changed Charley Farthing? (1974) and Deadly Strangers (1975). After The Kingfisher Caper in 1975, co-written by Boulting, she dropped out of the film industry for a few years.

Television resurgence and reception
In 1981, Mills returned to acting with a starring role in the UK television mini-series The Flame Trees of Thika, based on Elspeth Huxley's memoir of her childhood in East Africa. The series was well received, prompting her to accept more acting roles. She then returned to America and made two appearances on The Love Boat in 1985, and an episode of Murder, She Wrote in 1986.

Always welcomed at Disney, Mills narrated an episode of The Wonderful World of Disney, sparking renewed interest in her Disney work. In 1985, she was originally considered to voice Princess Eilonwy in Disney's 25th animated feature film The Black Cauldron, but was later replaced by the veteran British voice actress Susan Sheridan. Later, she reprised her roles as twins Sharon and Susan for a trio of Parent Trap television films: The Parent Trap II, Parent Trap III, and Parent Trap: Hawaiian Honeymoon. She also starred as the title character in the Disney Channel-produced television series Good Morning, Miss Bliss in 1987. The show was cancelled after 13 episodes and the rights were acquired by NBC, which reformatted Good Morning, Miss Bliss into Saved by the Bell without any further involvement from Mills. In recognition of her work with The Walt Disney Company, she was awarded the Disney Legends award in 1998.

Mills recalled her childhood in the 2000 documentary film Sir John Mills' Moving Memories, which was directed by Marcus Dillistone and produced by her brother Jonathan. In 2005 she appeared in the acclaimed short film, Stricken, written and directed by Jayce Bartok. In 2007 she began appearing as Caroline in the ITV1 African vet drama Wild at Heart; her sister Juliet Mills was a guest star in series 4 of the drama.

In 2010, Mills appeared in Mandie and the Cherokee Treasure, based on one of the popular Mandie novels of Lois Gladys Leppard. In 2023 she appeared in the fifth series of the ITV crime drama Unforgotten as Lady Emma Hume.

Stage career
Mills made her stage debut in a 1969 West End revival of Peter Pan. In 2000 she made her Off-Broadway debut in Sir Noël Coward's Suite in Two Keys, opposite American actress Judith Ivey, for which she won a Theatre World Award. In 1991 she appeared as Anna Leonowens in the Australian production of The King and I. In December 2007, for their annual birthday celebration of "The Master", The Noël Coward Society invited Mills as the guest celebrity to lay flowers in front of Coward's statue at New York's Gershwin Theatre, thereby commemorating the anniversary of the 108th birthday of Coward.

In 1997, Mills starred in the U.S. national tour of Rodgers and Hammerstein's The King and I. In 2001, Mills starred as Desiree Armfeldt in a production of "A Little Night Music" in Seattle, Washington. It was a co-production with the city's A Contemporary Theatre and the Fifth Avenue Theatre. In 2012 she starred as Ursula Widdington in the stage production of Ladies in Lavender at the Royal & Derngate Theatre, before embarking on a national UK tour. In 2015, she toured Australia with sister Juliet Mills and Juliet's husband  Maxwell Caulfield in the comedy Legends! by James Kirkwood. Mills starred in the 2018 Off-Broadway run of Isobel Mahon's Party Face at City Center.

Personal life

In 1966, while filming The Family Way, 20-year-old Mills met 53-year-old director Roy Boulting. The two were married in 1971 and owned a flat in London's Chelsea and Cobstone Windmill in Ibstone, Buckinghamshire, which was later sold. Their son, Crispian Mills, is the lead singer and guitarist for the raga rock band Kula Shaker. The couple divorced in 1977.

Mills had a second son, Jason Lawson, born in July 1976, during a relationship with actor Leigh Lawson. She and Lawson split up in the early 1980s.

In the 1980s, following her breakup with Lawson, Mills developed an interest in a number of Eastern religions. She wrote the preface to the book, The Hare Krishna Book of Vegetarian Cooking, published in 1984. In a 1997 article in People magazine, she stated that "she is 'not a part of Hare Krishna', though she delved into Hinduism and her own Christianity for guidance."

In 1988, Mills co-edited, with then-partner Marcus Maclaine ( Newby; brother of actor Maxwell Caulfield, husband of Hayley's sister, Juliet), the book My God, which consisted of brief letters from celebrities on their beliefs, or lack thereof, regarding God and the afterlife.

Mills's boyfriend since 1997 is actor/writer Firdous Bamji, who is 20 years her junior.

Health
In April 2008, Mills was diagnosed with breast cancer. She had surgery and started, but quickly abandoned, chemotherapy after only three sessions because of the severity of the side-effects. She credits her survival to the alternative treatments she used. She told Good Housekeeping magazine in January 2012 that she had fully recovered.

Memoir
Mills published a memoir about her life and career, Forever Young: A Memoir, in September 2021.

Filmography

Film

Television

Theatre

Awards and nominations

References

Further reading
 Mills, Hayley.  Forever Young: A Memoir. Grand Central Publishing, 2021.  .
 Dye, David. Child and Youth Actors: Filmography of Their Entire Careers, 1914–1985. Jefferson, North Carolina: McFarland & Co., p. 158.

External links

 
 Hayley Mills at the TCM Movie Database
 
 Hayley Comes Back to Her Richmond Roots

1946 births
20th-century English actresses
21st-century English actresses
Academy Juvenile Award winners
Actresses from London
BAFTA Most Promising Newcomer to Leading Film Roles winners
Booker authors' division
Disney people
English child actresses
English child singers
English Christians
English female dancers
English women singers
English film actresses
English musical theatre actresses
English stage actresses
English television actresses
New Star of the Year (Actress) Golden Globe winners
Living people
People from Marylebone
People educated at the Elmhurst School for Dance
Theatre World Award winners
British expatriate actresses in the United States
Disney Legends